Overnewton Anglican Community College (more commonly known as 'OACC', or simply Overnewton) is an independent, co-educational, day school, founded in 1987.

The college has two campuses, the Canowindra Campus (formerly Taylors Lakes Campus) located in Taylors Lakes, Melbourne, Australia and the Yirramboi Campus (formerly Keilor Campus) located in Keilor. Prep to Year 4 (commonly known within the College as the Junior School) and Year 9 is only available at the Canowindra Campus; and the Year 5 to Year 8 (known as the Middle School) and Year 10 to 12 (known as the Senior School) are only available at the Yirramboi Campus in Keilor.

Students at the school are encouraged to become involved in a range of co-curricular activities that complement the academic program.  Christian education is a core subject at all levels. Families are encouraged to take part in a Contribution Scheme, whereby they contribute 18 hours of service to the College each school term. The school has participated for many years in the Rock Eisteddfod Challenge in both the junior, premier and RAW divisions.

Master Plan
In 2018, the Principal of Overnewton, James Laussen, unveiled a new Master Plan the College. Implemented in 2021, this plan combined the Junior and Middle schools so that there was one Junior School at the Taylors Lakes Campus, and one Middle School at the Keilor Campus. Prior to the implementation, there were two Junior schools and two Middle schools (one at each campus). Including these changes to the structure of the school, there was the construction of a Prep - 2 Learning Centre and a new 6 - 7 learning centre, the latter of which won an award for the best new school building

Sport 
Overnewton is a member of the Association of Coeducational Schools (ACS).

ACS premierships 
Overnewton has won the following ACS premierships.

Boys:

 Basketball (2) - 2012, 2013
 Football (2) - 2014, 2015
 Futsal (5) - 2015, 2016, 2018, 2019, 2020
 Soccer (6) - 2006, 2012, 2015, 2017, 2018, 2019
 Softball (2) - 2014, 2015
 Table Tennis - 2020

Girls:

 Basketball (4) - 2005, 2013, 2017, 2018
 Football - 2005
 Futsal (2) - 2013, 2014
 Netball - 2019
 Soccer (3) - 2008, 2012, 2014
 Tennis (5) - 2016, 2017, 2018, 2019, 2020

References

External links
 Overnewton Anglican Community School Website

Anglican secondary schools in Melbourne
Educational institutions established in 1987
1987 establishments in Australia
Buildings and structures in the City of Brimbank